Burak Serdar Şanal (born 28 August 1988) is a Turkish actor.

Life and career 
A graduate of Maltepe University with a degree in drama studies, Şanal's first serious acting experience occurred between 2008–09 with a role in the TV series Küçük Kadınlar. At the same time, he portrayed the character of Murat in the Peri Masalı series. In 2008, he joined the cast of Bahar Dalları, playing the role of Mert. Playing in these series marked the breakthrough in his career and in 2011, Şanal was cast in Fox series Dinle Sevgili as Tolon.

His portrayal of the character Can in the 2011 TRT 1 series Avrupa Avrupa was praised by the critics. He appeared in a leading role in the second season of Avrupa Avrupa, playing the role of Ceyhun. Another breakthrough in his career occurred between 2014–2016, during which he won the praise of the audience with his role in TRT series Yeşil Deniz as İsmail. He was then cast in Fox series Rüzgarın Kalbi. In 2019, he had the role of Süleyman in the series Kimse Bilmez.

Filmography

References

External links 
 
 

1988 births
Male actors from Istanbul
Living people
Turkish male television actors
Turkish male stage actors
Maltepe University alumni